Jabrill Ahmad Peppers (born October 4, 1995) is an American football strong safety for the New England Patriots of the National Football League (NFL). He played college football at Michigan, and was drafted by the Cleveland Browns in the first round of the 2017 NFL Draft. A standout athlete early in high school, he was named the Air Force National Sophomore of the Year in 2011. Sports Illustrated named Peppers one of their "Future Game Changers," a group of 14 young athletes who are considered to be the brightest talents of their respective sports. Peppers was named the Thompson-Randle El Freshman of the Year, Freshman All-American, and a Second-team All-American in 2015. Peppers was named the Big Ten Defensive Player of the Year, Linebacker of the Year, Return Specialist of the Year, and an All-American in 2016.

High school career
A native of East Orange, New Jersey, Peppers originally attended Don Bosco Preparatory High School in Ramsey, New Jersey. He started as a cornerback in his freshman year, before also taking over as a running back as a sophomore. With Peppers, Don Bosco won consecutive New Jersey state championships in 2010 and 2011, and was the top-ranked team in the nation by USA Today in 2011.

Peppers left Don Bosco to attend Paramus Catholic High School in Paramus, New Jersey, where he helped lead the Paladins to another state championship over Bergen Catholic in 2012. Peppers was named Player of the Year by MSG Varsity after his junior season with Paramus Catholic. In his senior year, another successful season saw Peppers lead Paramus Catholic to another state title, defeating St. Peter's Prep., making Peppers a state championship winner in all four years of his high school career. Peppers was also selected to participate in the 2013–14 Under Armour All-America Game.

As a talented track athlete, Peppers set the New Jersey Non-Public Class A outdoor 100-meter dash record with a time of 10.77 seconds. He has a personal-best of 10.51 seconds in the 100 meters. In his senior year at Paramus Catholic, he won both the 100 and 200-meter dashes in New Jersey's 2013 Meet of Champions, becoming only the second person ever to do so, after Fabian Santiago of Oakcrest High School the year before.

Recruiting
The Rivals.com recruiting network identified Peppers as one of the five-star recruits in the Class of 2014, with ESPN ranking him as the #1 prospect in the 2014 class. On May 26, 2013, Peppers announced his verbal commitment to the Michigan Wolverines in a live telecast on ESPN. He was regarded as the head of Michigan's 2014 recruiting class. ESPN ranked him as the second-best recruit in the class of 2014, behind only running back Leonard Fournette.

College career
As a true freshman at Michigan, Peppers appeared in three games, making one start under then-head coach Brady Hoke. In his first career start against Appalachian State, he recorded two tackles and returned one punt for six yards. However, he sustained an injury in the game and was redshirted for the remainder of his freshman season.

In the 2015 season, Peppers had a new head coach in Jim Harbaugh. Following the 2015 season, Peppers was named the Big Ten Thompson-Randle El Freshman of the Year, and named to the All-Big Ten defensive first-team, by both the coaches and media, and the All-Big Ten special teams second-team by coaches. He was also named a Second-team All-American by CBS Sports and Sports Illustrated. He was also named to the Freshman All-America Team by Football Writers Association of America (FWAA). He was a finalist for the Paul Hornung Award. In 12 games, Peppers played a combined 986 snaps this season, with 50 coming on offense, 765 on defense, and 171 on special teams. On defense, he registered 45 total tackles, 5.5 tackles-for-loss, and 10 pass breakups. On special teams, he returned all 17 punts on the season for 194 yards, an average of 11.4 yards per return. Peppers has returned eight kickoffs for 223 yards, an average of 27.9 yards per return, on a unit that ranked second in the FBS with 28.41 yards per kick return. On offense, he added eight catches for 79 yards with 18 rushes for 72 yards and two touchdowns. Peppers has gained 568 all-purpose yards on the season, an average of 47.3 yards per game, ranking fifth on the team.

Following an outstanding performance on September 17, 2016, against Colorado, Peppers was named the Walter Camp FBS Player of the Week, Co-Big Ten Defensive Player of the Week, and Special Teams Player of the Week. He became the first conference player to be named both Defensive and Special Teams Player of the Week in the same week since the special teams honor was added in 1994. Peppers recorded a career-best nine tackles, including six solo stops and 3.5 tackles-for-loss. In addition, he recorded 204 yards of total offense, including his first career punt return for a touchdown.

Following the 2016 season, Peppers was named the Nagurski-Woodson Defensive Player of the Year, Butkus-Fitzgerald Linebacker of the Year, Rodgers-White Return Specialist of the Year, and a Unanimous All-American. He became the first player in Big Ten history to collect three individual honors since the conference expanded its individual award recognition program in 2011. Peppers was also named to the All-Big Ten defensive first-team, and All-Big Ten special teams first-team by both the coaches and media. Peppers helped lead a unit that finished first in eight Big Ten defensive categories. He contributed a career-best 72 tackles, 16 tackles-for-loss, four sacks, one interception, and one forced fumble. He also contributed in special teams, posting 21 punt returns for 310 yards (14.8 avg.) and one touchdown and had 10 kickoff returns for 260 yards (26.0 avg.). He also contributed on the offensive side of the ball, rushing 27 times for 167 yards and three touchdowns while catching two passes. He was also awarded the Paul Hornung Award, honoring the nation's most versatile college football player, and the Lott Trophy. Peppers played 933 snaps during the 2016 campaign, logging 726 plays on defense, 53 plays on offense, and 154 snaps on special teams. Peppers has seen the field at 15 different positions during the season. He finished fifth in voting for the 2016 Heisman Trophy.

On January 10, 2017, Peppers announced that he would be entering the 2017 NFL Draft, forgoing his final two seasons of NCAA eligibility.

College statistics

Professional career
Peppers received an invitation to the NFL Combine and attended as a linebacker, as well as a safety. He ran all combine and positional drills, except for the short shuttle and three-cone drill. He ran the fastest 40-yard dash among all of the linebackers. He participated in only positional drills at Michigan's Pro Day.

He was ranked the third-best safety in the draft by Sports Illustrated, Pro Football Focus, ESPN, NFL analyst Mike Mayock, and NFL analyst Bucky Brooks. On April 25, 2017, only two days before the draft, it was reported that Peppers received a positive test for a drug screen that was given at the combine.  The positive test was in fact due to a diluted sample and further reports revealed that Peppers drank ample amounts of water and was ill before traveling for the combine. Peppers attended pre-draft visits with the Baltimore Ravens and San Francisco 49ers. At the conclusion of the pre-draft process, Peppers was projected to be a first or second round pick by NFL draft experts and scouts.

Cleveland Browns

2017

The Cleveland Browns selected Peppers in the first round (25th overall) of the 2017 NFL Draft. Peppers was the third safety drafted in 2017, behind Jamal Adams (6th overall) and Malik Hooker (15th overall).

On July 22, 2017, the Cleveland Browns signed Peppers to a fully guaranteed four-year, $10.7 million contract that includes a signing bonus of $5.6 million.

Peppers entered training camp slated as the starting strong safety. Head coach Hue Jackson named Peppers the starting free safety to start the regular season, alongside strong safety Derrick Kindred. He was also named the starting kick returner and starting punt returner.

He made his professional regular season debut and first career start in the Cleveland Browns' season-opener against the Pittsburgh Steelers and recorded four combined tackles and broke up a pass in their 21–18 loss. In addition, he had one kickoff return for 14-yards and three punt returns for 34-yards. He was inactive for two games (Weeks 7–8) due to a toe injury. In Week 12, he collected a season-high seven combined tackles during a 30–16 loss at the Cincinnati Bengals. He was sidelined for the Browns' Week 14 loss to the Green Bay Packers due to a knee injury. On December 31, 2017, Peppers recorded four solo tackles, broke up a pass, and made his first career interception as the Browns lost 28–24 at the Pittsburgh Steelers. Peppers made his first career interception off a pass attempt by quarterback Landry Jones in the first quarter. He finished his rookie season in 2017 with 57 combined tackles (44 solo), three pass deflections, and one interception in 13 games and 13 starts. Peppers also had 14 kick returns for 318 yards (22.7 YPR) and 30 punt returns for 180 yards (6.0 YPR). The Cleveland Browns finished the 2017 NFL season with a record of 0–16. Peppers lined up as a free safety for 88.2% of the Browns' defensive snaps according to Pro Football Focus. He received an overall grade of 45.5 from Pro Football Focus in 2017.

2018
Defensive coordinator Gregg Williams elected to move Peppers back to strong safety after the Browns traded for Damarious Randall. Peppers competed to be the starting strong safety against  Derrick Kindred. Head coach Hue Jackson named Peppers the starting strong safety to begin the regular season, alongside free safety Damarious Randall and cornerbacks Denzel Ward and T. J. Carrie. He also retained his duties as the starting kick and punt returner. In Week 15 against the Denver Broncos, Peppers had 6 tackles, an interception, and a game-winning sack on fourth down.

New York Giants

2019

On March 13, 2019, Peppers was acquired by the New York Giants, alongside Kevin Zeitler, the Browns' first-round pick, and their  in the 2019 NFL Draft, in exchange for Odell Beckham Jr. and Olivier Vernon. In week 4 against the Washington Redskins, Peppers recorded a 32-yard pick six off Dwayne Haskins in the 24–3 win. In week 9 against the Dallas Cowboys on Monday Night Football, Peppers recorded a team high 12 tackles and forced a fumble on wide receiver Randall Cobb that was recovered by teammate Antoine Bethea in the 37–18 loss.

Two weeks after suffering a transverse process fracture in the week 11 match-up against the Chicago Bears, Peppers was placed on season ending injured reserve on December 7, 2019.

2020-2021
On April 29, 2020, the Giants picked up the fifth-year option on Peppers' contract, worth $6.77 million guaranteed for the 2021 season.
For the 2020 season Peppers was a captain as a part of the special team’s unit.

In Week 7 against the Philadelphia Eagles on Thursday Night Football, Peppers recorded his first sack of the season on Carson Wentz during the 22–21 loss. 
Peppers was fined $11,301 for a hit that injured quarterback Kyle Allen in a 23–20 victory over the Washington Football Team.
During the game, Peppers also intercepted a pass thrown by Alex Smith, Allen's replacement, and recovered a fumble.

On October 26, 2021, Peppers was placed on injured reserve after suffering a torn ACL and a high ankle sprain in Week 7.

New England Patriots

2022
On April 4, 2022, Peppers signed a one-year contract with the New England Patriots.

2023
On March 17, 2023, Peppers re-signed with the New England Patriots on a two-year deal.

Personal life
Peppers was raised in East Orange, New Jersey by his mother, Ivory Bryant. His father, Terry Peppers, was active in his life until he was arrested when Jabrill was seven. He was arrested after being charged in a racketeering case as a part of the Bloods street gang, and was released from prison in 2014. His older brother, Don Curtis, died in January 2010, after being shot while standing at the counter of Lucky Joy Restaurant in Newark, New Jersey. Peppers maintained a 3.8 GPA through high school and is an avid rapper. He has stated that he has always had an interest in Michigan's football program and is a fan of Charles Woodson. He cultivated a relationship with Woodson throughout his time at Michigan. Peppers is also a member of Omega Psi Phi having become a member while an undergrad at the University of Michigan (Phi Chapter).

Peppers was in a relationship with former Cavalier dancer, Bryashia Atchison from 2018 until December 2021. They welcomed their son, Brasen Peppers, in December 2022.

Endorsements
On March 6, 2017, it was reported that Peppers had signed a multi-year contract with Adidas.

References

External links

 
 Michigan Wolverines bio
 New York Giants bio

1995 births
Living people
African-American players of American football
All-American college football players
American football return specialists
American football safeties
Cleveland Browns players
Don Bosco Preparatory High School alumni
Michigan Wolverines football players
Paramus Catholic High School alumni
People from Montclair, New Jersey
Players of American football from New Jersey
Sportspeople from East Orange, New Jersey
21st-century African-American sportspeople
New England Patriots players